Connolly Park  is a GAA stadium in Collooney, County Sligo, Ireland. It is the home ground of the Owenmore Gaels GAA club.

The Sligo county football team have contested National Football League fixtures there when their home ground Markievicz Park has been unavailable. Sligo were relegated from the league here in 2019.

See also
 List of Gaelic Athletic Association stadiums
 List of stadiums in Ireland by capacity

References

Gaelic games grounds in the Republic of Ireland
Sligo GAA
Sports venues in County Sligo